Todd Kabel (December 7, 1965 – March 27, 2021) was a Canadian Thoroughbred horse racing jockey. A native of McCreary, Manitoba, he began his career as a jockey at Assiniboia Downs in Winnipeg, Manitoba, and in 1987 started competing at tracks in Ontario, moving to Toronto permanently in 1991.

Riding from a base at Woodbine Racetrack, Todd Kabel won Canada's Sovereign Award seven times, beginning with the Outstanding Apprentice Jockey in 1986 followed by Outstanding Jockey in 1992 and 1995 and during the four-year period from 2003 to 2006.

In the 1997 Breeders' Cup Juvenile at Hollywood Park Racetrack, Kabel rode 78-1 long shot Dawson's Legacy to a second-place finish behind 1997's American Horse of the Year, Favorite Trick. In 2003 he became the first Canadian-based jockey to earn more than $10 million in purse money and the following year he equalled the  Hall of Fame jockey Avelino Gomez's record of 36 graded stakes race wins in a single season.

Among Kabel's major wins he rode Regal Discovery to victory in the 1995 Queen's Plate, the country's most prestigious race and that was his big break. In 2000, aboard Scatter The Gold, he earned his second victory in the Queen's Plate then won the Prince of Wales Stakes, both of which were run on dirt. However, Kabel and Scatter The Gold missed winning the Canadian Triple Crown when they finished third in the Breeders' Stakes on turf.

Todd Kabel retired from Thoroughbred racing having won 3,306 races with total purses amounting to $105,831,055.

Year-end charts

References

Canadian jockeys
Sovereign Award winners
Sportspeople from Manitoba
1965 births
2021 deaths